RP-S512 is a light-sport aircraft  built by Famous Secret Precision Machining Inc., Philippines. It is the first Filipino-made operational aircraft.

Design and development 
The RP-S512 is 740 pound gliding aircraft. The aircraft was developed on July 26, 2014. Unlike other airplanes it doesn't need any aviation fuel to operate the plane. It will fly on the unleaded gasoline on a speed of 116 miles per hour or 4–5 hours for 700 kilometers in the air.

Specifications

References

Homebuilt aircraft